Leslie Theodore Lyall (1905–1996) was a British Protestant Christian missionary in China. He also authored several books about China. He served with the China Inland Mission.

Bibliography 
 Leslie Lyall, John Sung (1954, ret 1961), Come Wind, Come Weather: The Present Experience of the Church in China (1961)
 The Church Local and Universal (1962)
 Urgent Harvest (1962)
 A Passion for the Impossible: The Continuing Story of the Mission Hudson Taylor Began (1965, ret 1976)
 Red Sky at Night (1969)
 A World to Win (1972)
 Three of China's Mighty Men (1973)
 ''New Spring in China: A Christian Appraisal' (1979)
 Obituaries: The Independent, February 24, 1996; Daily Telegraph, February 19, 1996; The Guardian, February 16, 1996
 See also Douglas Johnson, Contending for the Faith: A History of the Evangelical Movement in the Universities and Colleges (1979).

Further reading 
 Historical Bibliography of the China Inland Mission

See also 
 List of China Inland Mission missionaries in China

English Protestant missionaries
Protestant missionaries in China
British expatriates in China
Christian writers
1905 births
1996 deaths